European route E 451 is a Class B road part of the International E-road network.

Route 
 
 E40, E4, E44 Giessen
 E35, E42 Frankfurt
 E50 Mannheim

E-routes 
The newest route is between 18 and 23 km (8.7 and 11.4 miles) above interchanges between E40 and E42 are more possible to extend the route to 111.3 or 116.3 km (71.2 or 76.6 miles).

Details 
New route is at construction (it began in October 2008 and finishing in 2013).

External links 
 UN Economic Commission for Europe: Overall Map of E-road Network (2007)

451
451